Baltic Beverages Holding is a brewing company owned by Carlsberg Group. It is a significant operator in the brewing industry in Russia, Ukraine, the Baltic countries and Kazakhstan, most notably holding a stake in Baltika Breweries.

History
The company was founded in 1991 by the Finnish brewery Hartwall and the Swedish brewery Pripps.

Breweries

Aldaris Brewery
With its origins dating back to 1865 in Riga, Aldaris ('brewer' in Latvian) employs more than 200 workers, and is one of the biggest breweries in Latvia. It brews a range of beers, mostly pale lagers. The most popular brands include Mežpils and Porteris. Since 2013 many beer brands (Luksus, Zelta, Gaišais light beer, Pilzenes Pilsner and Apinītis) are brewed in other breweries of BBH. A publicly available museum has been opened in the brewery complex in 2015.

Utenos Alus Brewery

Utenos Alus is a Lithuanian brewery, established in Utena in 1977.

Utenos Alus and Švyturys breweries merged into joint-stock company Švyturys-Utenos alus in 2001. In February 2003 the company was reorganised into a closed-end company.

Švyturys Brewery

Švyturys is a brewery in Klaipėda, Lithuania. It is part of Švyturys-Utenos alus. The brewery was established in 1784 by the merchant J. W. Reincke in Klaipėda, then known as Memel in East Prussia. After the creation of the German Empire, the brewery became part of Memeler Aktien-Brauerei & Destillation on September 15, 1871. It passed to Lithuanian control when the Memel Territory was annexed by Lithuania in 1923. During the Second World War, the region was occupied by Nazi Germany and, from 1940, the brewery was then administered by Memeler Ostquell Brauerei GmbH. After the war, in 1945, the Klaipėda Region was transferred back to Lithuania and the brewery returned to the Lithuanian control.

Švyturys and Utenos Alus breweries merged into the joint-stock company Švyturys-Utenos alus in 2001. In February 2003 the company was reorganised into a closed-end company. Currently Carlsberg Breweries controls Švyturys-Utenos alus through Baltic Beverages Holding.

In June 2000 Švyturio Ekstra beer received Silver award in Dortmunder/European Export category at World Beer Cup silver. Same brand won gold medal in Dortmunder beer category at World Beer Championship (USA) in November 2001. In 2002 Švyturys Baltijos beer was awarded Bronze award at World Beer Cup in Marzen/Octoberfest category.

Baltika Brewery

Russian Baltika Brewery began production in 1990. The majority of the company's shares (85%) are owned by Baltic Beverages Holding (BBH).

Saku Brewery
Saku Brewery dates back to 1820, making it the oldest commercial brewery in Estonia. It makes a wide range of pale lagers, such as the very popular Saku Originaal, and a few stronger and darker lagers. Since 2008, Saku has been 100% owned by the Carlsberg Group.

References

External links
Utenos Alus website
Švyturys website

Beer in Lithuania
Beer in Russia
Beer in Ukraine
Beer in Estonia
Breweries in Estonia